Lauren Barnholdt is an American author of over 30 books including novels for children, adolescents, and young adults, as well as guides for authors.

Critical reception 
Several of her works have been reviewed by The Horn Book Magazine and Kliatt Magazine.

Bibliography

At The Party
Telling Secrets (2010)
Falling Hard (2011)
Getting Close (2011)
Kissing Perfect (2011)

Devon Delaney
The Secret Identity of Devon Delaney (2007)
Devon Delaney Should Totally Know Better (2009)

Girl Meets Ghost
Girl Meets Ghost (2013)
The Harder the Fall (2013)
Ghost of a Chance (2014)

Haley Twitch
Hailey Twitch Is Not a Snitch (2010, illustrated by Suzanne Beaky)
Hailey Twitch and the Great Teacher Switch (2010)
Hailey Twitch and the Campground Itch (2011)
Hailey Twitch and the Wedding Glitch (2011)

Moment of Truth
Heat of the Moment (2015)
One Moment in Time (2015)
From This Moment (2015)

The Witches of Santa Anna
Claimed
Tricked
Rumored
Hushed
Pursued
Enticed 
Ruined
Denial
Suspicion
Isolation
Paranoia
Fear
Oblivion
Forgotten
Broken
Stolen
Taken
Risen
Given

Stand-alone works
Reality Chick (2006)
Two-Way Street (2007)
Four Truths and a Lie (2008)
One Night That Changes Everything (2010)
Aces Up (2010)
Rules for Secret Keeping (2010)
Taste (2011, with Aaron Gorvine)
Sometimes It Happens (2011)
Fake Me a Match (2011)
The Thing About the Truth (2012)
Love of the Party (2012)
Right of Way (2013)
Through to You (2014)

Non-fiction
Writing & Selling the Young Adult Novel (2006, with Nadia Cornier)
Fab Girls Guide to Sticky Situations (2007)

See also
 Chick lit
 Lauren Henderson
 Kieran Scott

References

External links
 

Living people
21st-century American novelists
21st-century American women writers
American science fiction writers
American children's writers
American women novelists
Women science fiction and fantasy writers
American women children's writers
Year of birth missing (living people)